Patriarch Gabriel II may refer to:

 Gabriel II of Constantinople, Ecumenical Patriarch in 1657
 Gabriel of Blaouza, Maronite Patriarch in 1704–1705